Parnashavari (IAST: Parṇaśabarī), also spelt as Paranasavari (Paranasabari),  is a Hindu deity adopted as Buddhist deity of diseases, worship of which is believed to offer effective protection against out-breaks of epidemics.

Parnasabari is also depicted in some images of the Pala period found in Dhaka, as a main goddess and escorted by Hindu deities Jvarasura and Shitala. Both of these escorts are disease related Hindu deities. In India, the Kurkihar hoard contains seven bronze images of Parnasabari belonging to 10th- 12th century AD.

In Buddhism, Parnasabari is depicted as an attendant of the Buddhist deity of same name, Tara. Some say that the term Parnasabari is an attempt to connect the deity with Vindya region, as Sabaras held a stronghold over the region.

References

Buddhist goddesses
Tibetan Buddhist deities
Hindu goddesses
Forms of Parvati
Avalokiteśvara
Health goddesses
Plague gods